Events in the year 1944 in Belgium.

Incumbents
 Monarch: Leopold III
 Regent: Prince Charles, Count of Flanders (from 21 September)
 Prime Minister: Hubert Pierlot

Events
January
 14 January – Occupying German authorities order evacuation of civilians from the Belgian coast.
 16 January – Groupe G resistance organisation dynamites pylons to sabotage electricity supply.

February
 5 February – Occupying authorities streamline procedure for death sentences on charges of "terrorism".

April
 11 April – Heavy allied bombing of industrial targets and transport infrastructure in Belgian cities.
 19 April – Mechelen and Leuven bombed.

May
 21 May – Cardinal Van Roey appeals to Allies to cease bombing civilian targets in Belgium.

June
 7 June – Leopold III, under house arrest since 1940, deported to Germany together with his wife and children.

July
 18 July – Military occupation under General Alexander von Falkenhausen replaced by Reichskommissariat of Belgium and Northern France under Reichskommissar Josef Grohé.
 22 July – Delegates of the Belgian government in exile are among the founding signatories of the Bretton Woods system establishing the International Monetary Fund and the International Bank for Reconstruction and Development
 27 July – Collaborationist leaders Jef van de Wiele and Hendrik Elias meet with Heinrich Himmler.

August
 18 August – Courcelles Massacre in retaliation for the assassination of the collaborationist mayor of Charleroi by the Belgian Resistance.
 31 August – Many Belgian collaborators flee to Germany.

September
 2 September – Allied ground forces enter Belgium.
 4 September – Liberation of Brussels and Antwerp; Independent Belgian Brigade (Brigade Piron) enters Brussels.
 5 September – Customs Convention between Belgium, the Netherlands and Luxembourg signed.
 7 September – Liberation of Liège.
 8 September – Battle of Geel begins (to 23 September)
 15 September – Cinemas reopened in liberated parts of Belgium.
 21 September – Prince Charles, Count of Flanders appointed Prince Regent in the king's absence.
 27 September – Government in exile becomes government of national unity.

October
 2 October – Battle of the Scheldt begins (to 8 November)
 12 October – First V-1 flying bomb attack on Belgium.

November
 1 November – Operation Infatuate launched
 3 November – Last German forces in Belgium surrender at Knokke.
 8 November – Belgian Parliament lifts parliamentary privilege of members of collaborationist organisations.
 18 November – Resistance groups disarmed.
 25 November – Resistance groups demonstrate in Parliament to demand official recognition.
 28 November – Allied shipping starts to use the Port of Antwerp.

December
 16 December – German counter-offensive into Belgium: Battle of the Bulge begins with Battle of Lanzerath Ridge, Battle of Losheim Gap, Battle of St. Vith and Battle of Elsenborn Ridge
 17 December – Malmedy massacre
 20 December – Siege of Bastogne begins (to 27 December)

Births
 31 March – Jean-Marie André, scientist
 5 April – Willy Planckaert, road bicycle racer
 1 June – Freddy Herbrand, Olympic athlete
 8 October – Maurice Bodson, politician (died 2020)
 21 December – Jacques Beurlet, footballer (died 2020)

Deaths
 14 January – Walthère Dewé, resistance leader, shot in the street
 28 January – Aloïs Biebuyck, officer in the First World War
 23 February – Leo Baekeland, chemical engineer
 3 March – Paul-Émile Janson, liberal politician (Buchenwald concentration camp)
 21 March – Pierre de Caters, aviator
 12 April – Emmanuel de Blommaert, Olympic rider
 10 May – Adolphe De Meulemeester, colonial official
 27 May – Adrienne Barbanson, musical patron
 12 August – Suzanne Spaak, resister
 17 August – Oswald Englebin, collaborationist mayor of Charleroi, assassinated
 20 August – Hippolyte De Kempeneer, film producer
 7 October – Abraham Leon, Trotskyist theorist (Auschwitz concentration camp)
 1 December – Balthazar De Beukelaer, Olympic fencer
 11 December – Joseph Maréchal, Thomist philosopher

References

 
1940s in Belgium